Sir Simon Lawrance Gass  (born 2 November 1956) is a British civil servant. Since 2019, he has chaired the Joint Intelligence Committee and he also currently serves as the British Prime Minister's representative on Afghanistan. Between 2018 and 2019, he was the Commandant of the Royal College of Defence Studies. During his diplomatic career, he served as British ambassador to Greece and to Iran.

Career
 1977 – Joined the FCO
 1979–83 – Lagos
 1984–87 – Athens
 1987–90 – FCO in London
 1990–92 – Assistant Private Secretary to Foreign Secretary, London
 1992–95 – Rome
 1995–98 – Counsellor, FCO
 1998–01 – Deputy High Commissioner South Africa
 2001–04 – Director, Resources, then Finance, FCO
 2004–09 – Ambassador to Greece
 2009–11 – Ambassador to Iran
 2011–12 – NATO Senior Civilian Representative in Afghanistan
 2013–16 – Political Director, FCO, and Prime Minister's Special Representative for Afghanistan and Pakistan
 2017–present – Chair of the FCDO Services Board
 2018–2019 – Commandant Royal College of Defence Studies
 2019–present – Chair of the Joint Intelligence Committee

Ambassador to Iran 
He was British Ambassador to Iran 2009–11. He arrived in post during the Spring of 2009 from his previous posting in Greece and was present during the June 2009 protests following the disputed re-election of Iranian President Mahmoud Ahmedinejad.

Following these events Gass posted his views from Tehran on the social networking site Twitter, commenting on the Iranian regime's record on human rights, political prisoners and freedom of speech. His 'tweets' are shared widely by Iranian reformists and diaspora across the web as well as being featured in mainstream media. In January 2011, Gass passed the 1000 follower mark, making him one of the most followed diplomats on Twitter.

In December 2010, Gass's digital activities caused mild uproar among Iranian politicians, who called for his expulsion after he highlighted the case of human rights lawyer Nasrin Sotoudeh in an article posted on the British Embassy in Iran website. The statement was released on International Human Rights Day and criticised Iran's human rights record. The Foreign and Commonwealth Office defended Gass's comments, which gained widespread approval from his Iranian reformist followers on Twitter.

NATO and FCO
In February 2011 Gass was seconded to NATO as Senior Civilian Representative in Afghanistan. After serving in this post for 18 months he returned to the FCO in London as Director General, Political, and the Prime Minister's Special Representative for Afghanistan and Pakistan.  He retired from the FCO in 2016.

FCDO Services
In 2017, Gass was appointed Non-Executive Director and Chair of the Board of FCDO Services.

Honours
In the 1998 Queen's Birthday Honours, Gass was appointed a Companion of the Order of St Michael and St George (CMG). In the 2011 New Year Honours, he was promoted to Knight Commander of the Order of St Michael and St George (KCMG).

References

External links
British Embassy in Tehran
UK in Iran Facebook Page
Article by Simon Gass: International Human Rights Day, British Embassy Tehran, 10 December 2010, via archive.org

1956 births
Living people
People educated at Eltham College
Alumni of the University of Reading
Ambassadors of the United Kingdom to Greece
Ambassadors of the United Kingdom to Iran
NATO officials
Knights Commander of the Order of St Michael and St George
Commanders of the Royal Victorian Order